Samuel Hollander,  (born April 6, 1937) is a British/Canadian/Israeli economist.

Born in London, he received a B.Sc. in economics from the London School of Economics in 1959. In 1961 he received an AM and a Ph.D. in 1963 from Princeton University. He started with the University of Toronto becoming an Assistant Professor (1963–1966), Associate Professor (1966–1970), Professor (1970–1984), University Professor (1984–1998), and upon his retirement in 1998, University Professor Emeritus. Since 2000 he has been a professor at Ben-Gurion University of the Negev. He became a citizen of Canada in 1967 and of Israel in 2000.

Samuel Hollander is one of the most influential and controversial living authors on History of Economic Thought, especially on classical economics. His monumental studies of Adam Smith, David Ricardo, Thomas Malthus and John Stuart Mill have provoked some sharp reactions. Especially his "new view" of David Ricardo as a direct predecessor of later neo-classical economists such as Marshall and Walras has triggered heated debates. Apart from many critics he has also enjoyed the support of a considerable number of prominent fellow economists. His work was highly recommended by the late Lord Robbins, who says "... he really surpasses all previous historians of economic thought, especially on Ricardo" (Robbins, 1998, p. 143).

Most important publications

 Studies in Classical Political Economy/I The Economics of Adam Smith (Toronto: University of Toronto Press and London: Heinemann), 1973, x + 350. 
 Studies in Classical Political Economy/II The Economics of David Ricardo (Toronto: UTP and London: Heinemann), 1979, xiv + 759. 
 Studies in Classical Political Economy/III The Economics of John Stuart Mill (Toronto: UTP and Oxford: Blackwell), 1985: Volume I, Theory and Method, xx + 481. Volume II, Political Economy, 482-1030.
 Classical Economics (Oxford: Blackwell, 1987; Toronto: UTP, 1992), x + 485. 
 Collected Essays/I Ricardo. The ‘New View’ (London and New York: Routledge), 1995, xiv + 369. 
 Studies in Classical Political Economy/IV The Economics of Thomas Robert Malthus (Toronto: UTP), 1997, xviii + 1045.
 Collected Essays/II The Literature of Political Economy (London and New York: Routledge), 1998, xv + 410.
 Collected Essays/III John Stuart Mill on Economic Theory and Method (London and New York: Routledge), 2000, xiii + 299.
 Jean-Baptiste Say and the Classical Canon in Economics: the British Connection in French Classicism (London and New York: Routledge), 2005, xiii + 322.
 Studies in Classical Political Economy/V. The Economics of Karl Marx: Analysis and Application (Historical Perspectives on Modern Economics) (Cambridge University Press), 2008, 552.
 Friedrich Engels and Marxian Political Economy (Historical Perspectives on Modern Economics) (forthcoming Cambridge University Press, April 2011)

Honours
 In 1976 he was made a Fellow of the Royal Society of Canada.
 In 1998 he was made an Officer of the Order of Canada.
 In 1999 he was made a Distinguished Fellow of the History of Economics Society (citation).

References
 Official website: http://www.samuel-hollander.com/
 
 ‘It’s an ill wind’... Autobiographical memoir from the book Collected Essays/II The Literature of Political Economy (1998)

External links 

 Samuel Hollander archival papers held at the University of Toronto Archives and Records Management Services

1937 births
Living people
British economists
Canadian economists
Historians of economic thought
Fellows of the Royal Society of Canada
Officers of the Order of Canada
Alumni of the London School of Economics
Israeli people of Canadian-Jewish descent
British people of Canadian-Jewish descent
English people of Canadian-Jewish descent